Aggersvold is a manor house and estate located just north of Jyderup, Holbæk Municipality, some 80 kilometres west of Copenhagen, Denmark. The current main building was built in 1833-35 for major-general Harald Rothe (1781-1848). It was listed on the Danish registry of protected buildings and places in 1944.

History
Aggersvold traces its history back to the Middle Ages when its name was Navnet and it was located in the village of Marke.

In 1581, Frederik Lange and his wife Dorthe Christoffersdatter Lindenov moved the manor to its current location, renaming it Aggersvold after a village, Agerup, which had formerly been located at the site. Their son, Gunde Lange, sold the estate to admiral Henrik Vind in 1630. Vind, who had served in the Kalmar War (1611–13) and  Kejserkrigen (1625-29), died just 39 years old in 1733. His widow, Margrethe Pedersdatter Laxmand, who inherited the estate, married Joachim von Bredow 1641. Their daughter, Marie Margrethe von Bredow, sold Aggersvold in 1691.

The new owner was Niels Benzon, a major landowner and president of work for the Danish Chancellery, who had been ennobled in 1780. After his death in 1708, Aggersvold was passed on to his son Jacob Benzon. Oeder Benzon, one of his brothers, acquired it in 1820 and a third brother, Lars Benzon, was the owner from 1733.

Lars Benzon sold Aggersvold to Herman Leopoldus in 1737. He was later ennobled under the name Løvenskiold. Løvenskjold's son, Severin Leopoldus Løvenskiold, sold it to Christian Lautrup in 1750.

In 1753, Aggersvold was acquired by Peder Juel. He expanded the estate with land that had until then belonged to four farms in the village of Høed. In  1760, he sold the estate to Laurits Switzer.

Christian Albrecht Lerche purchased Aggersvold in 1865. He did not live on the estate and the building gradually fell into disrepair while most of the tenant farms were sold to the tenant farmers. Lerche's widow sold it to Villars Knudsen Lunn . He expanded the forests significantly in around 1900.

In  1915, Aggersvold was sold to a consortium. The intention was to sell the land off in lots but these plans were not realized.

Thor Timm purchased Aggersvold in 1916. Some of the land was used for the creation of new smallholdings in the period between 1923 and 1942. He also established the farms Skyttehaven (1926) and Fruensfold (1930).

In 2021, Aggersvold was purchased by Jørgen Torrey Troelsfeldt via the property company De Forenede Ejendomsselskaber

Architecture
The two-storey main building is built to a restrained Neoclassical design. The median risalit is decorated with pilasters and tipped by a triangular pediment. Monumental, Bornholmian sandstone staircases lead up to the main entrances on both sides of the building.

The farm buildings, a three-winged complex surrounding a central courtyard, is located to the north of the main building.

Today
The estate covers a total area of 344 hectares of which 324 hectares are woodland and seven hectares are pastures.

The main building has been used as a venue for weddings, conferences and other events. The stables have room for 20 horses.

List of owners
 (1581-       ) Frederik Lange
 (       -1630) Gunde Lange
 (1630-1633) Henrik Vind
 (1633-1640) Margrethe Pedersdatter Laxmand, gift 1) Vind 2) von Bredow
 (1640-1660) Joachim von Bredow
 (1660-1681) Margrethe Pedersdatter Laxmand, gift 1) Vind 2) von Bredow
 (1681-1691) Marie Margrethe Joachimsdatter von Bredow
 (1691-1708) Niels Benzon
 (1708-1720) Jacob Benzon
 (1720-1733) Peder Benzon
 (1733-1737) Lars Benzon
 (1737-1750) Herman Leopoldus Løvenskiold
 (1750)         Severin Leopoldus Løvenskiold
 (1750-1753) Christian Lautrup
 (1753-1760) Peder Juel
 (1760-1777) Laurits Switzer
 (1777-1791) C.A. Frost
 (1791-1805) J. Fr. van Deurs
 (1805-1806) Otto Joachim Moltke
 (1806)         Otto Lerche
 (1806-1848) Harald Rothe
 (1848-1865) Carl Peter Rothe
 (1865-1885) Christian Albrecht lensgreve Lerche
 (1885-1898) Cornelia lensgrevinde Tillisch gift Lerche
 (1898-1915) Villars Knudsen Lunn
 (1915-1916) Konsortium
 (1916-       ) Thor Timm
 (      -1970) Svend Aage Timm
 (1970-2007) Aksel Tving
 (2007-2021       ) Aggersvold ApS v/ Johan Schrøder

References

External links

 Official website
 Spurce
 Source

Manor houses in Holbæk Municipality
Buildings and structures associated with the Lerche family
Houses completed in 1835